Dutchtown High School is a public high school located north of Hampton, Georgia, United States. This school is one of ten high schools operated by the Henry County School District.

Dutchtown High School opened in 2004 and is located in the Dutchtown settlement in the old Sixth Militia District of Henry County along Jonesboro Road. The school is accredited by the Georgia Accrediting Commission and the Association of Colleges and Schools. The school's mascot is the bulldog.

The school offers Advanced Placement courses and examinations, with a 26 percent participation rate in the program among students. As of 2018, it does not have a ranking in U.S. News & World Report's ranking of high schools in the United States.

References

External links

Public high schools in Georgia (U.S. state)
Schools in Henry County, Georgia
Educational institutions established in 2004
2004 establishments in Georgia (U.S. state)